Since its creation in the 2007 municipal reform, Hjørring had only had mayors from the Social Democrats. However the Social Democrats ended up losing 5 seats. This might have been a consequence of the 2020 Danish mink cull, and Hjørring being a municipality with a high number of mink farming. Only Danish Social Liberal Party from the traditional red bloc in Denmark, gained a seat, and the bloc had only won 13 of the 16 seats needed for a majority. Centre-right Venstre and Conservatives, both gained 2 and 4 seats respectively, and had a majority of seats together. On 24 November 2021, a constitution between Danish Social Liberal Party, Conservatives and Venstre was agreed upon, which saw Søren Smalbro from Venstre become mayor, with Per Møller from Conservatives, becoming deputy mayor.

Electoral system
For elections to Danish municipalities, a number varying from 9 to 31 are chosen to be elected to the municipal council. The seats are then allocated using the D'Hondt method and a closed list proportional representation.
Hjørring Municipality had 31 seats in 2021

Unlike in Danish General Elections, in elections to municipal councils, electoral alliances are allowed.

Electoral alliances 

Electoral Alliance 1

Electoral Alliance 2

Electoral Alliance 3

Electoral Alliance 4

Results

Notes

References 

Hjørring